Allegheny-Clarion Valley Junior/Senior High School, or A-C Valley, is a rural, public high school near Foxburg, in southwestern Clarion County, Pennsylvania, United States. In 2012, the school had 368 students in grades 7th through 12th. and 40 staff Members in 2013.

Allegheny-Clarion Valley Junior Senior High School students can receive vocational training at Clarion County Career Center.

Extracurriculars
The Allegheny-Clarion Valley School District offers a variety of clubs, activities and an extensive sports program. Beginning in 2016, Allegheny-Clarion Valley Junior/Senior High School entered into an athletic co-op agreement with Union Junior/Senior High School with regard to football, cross country, and golf. Under the agreement, Union High School would act as the host school for football (Though games are expected to be played at both schools evenly), while A-C is the host school for golf and cross-country.

Athletics
The district funds:

Varsity

Boys
Baseball - A
Basketball- A
Cross Country - A (Co-op with Union)
Football - A (Co-op with Union)
Golf - AA (Co-op with Union)
Track and Field - AA

Girls
Basketball - A
Cheer - AAAAAA
Cross Country - A (Co-op with Union)
Golf - AA (Co-op with Union)
Softball - A
Track and Field - AA
Volleyball - A

According to PIAA directory January 2018

References

External links
 

Public high schools in Pennsylvania
Schools in Clarion County, Pennsylvania
Public middle schools in Pennsylvania